Ocha la Rocha is an American alternative rock band based in Atlanta, Georgia, United States. In 2005, their first album, Ocha Lives was recorded and highlights the band's original rock-country sound. Johnny la Rocha's voice and song-writing has become a staple in the south.

History
Ocha la Rocha was founded by Johnny la Rocha in 2004.  In 2005, Johnny met Ronney D and they evolved into a live act that debuted in Atlanta, GA at New Street Gallery. After going through a string of drummers, the original lineup became Johnny, Ronney and Satchel Mallon, whose presences are made known on the Ocha Lives Album.

In 2010, the band completed their second release (EP) Stealing Time with James Barber, a record producer of such artists as Ryan Adams, Courtney Love, & Andy Zipf. Stealing Time is scheduled for an early 2010 release.

Their music has been featured in Gold Circle Films My Sassy Girl (2008 film), Hot Tub Time Machine, Going the Distance and such television as Dirty Sexy Money, America's Funniest Home Videos a Burger King advertisement, ABC Family's Greek, LA Ink, Life Unexpected, Cougar Town, and The Middle.

Their debut record Ocha Lives wauus re-released in early 2010 because of the band's success.   It was produced by Kristofer Sampson at Nickel and Dime Studios in Atlanta.

Members
Johnny la Rocha - Guitars, Vocals
Ronney Danger - Bass
Milton Chapman - Keys
Anna Kramer - Guitar, Vocals
Taylor Crowell - Guitar
Justin Minchew - Bass
Chandler Rentz - Drums
Satchel Mallon - Drums

Supplemental musicians
William Brandon
Jason Anchando
Marcos Diableros
Page Waldrop
Kristofer Sampson

Releases

Albums
Ocha Lives - 2007
Stealing Time - 2010
Ocha Scores - 2013

References
 AOL MUSIC
 Official Myspace
 Record Label
 UrbandLazar Music on Myspace
 OCHA LA ROCHA HEAVY / TUNNELS & LINES DIGITAL 7"

External links
 Official Site 

Garage punk groups
Indie rock musical groups from Georgia (U.S. state)
Musical groups established in 2004
American southern rock musical groups